Sir Archibald Stewart, 1st Baronet, of Blackhall of Blackhall, was Commissioner of the constituency of Renfrewshire in 1667.

References

Year of birth missing
Year of death missing
People from Renfrewshire
Baronets in the Baronetage of Nova Scotia
Shire Commissioners to the Parliament of Scotland
Members of the Parliament of Scotland 1669–1674